Wesółka may refer to the following places in Poland:
Wesółka, Lower Silesian Voivodeship (south-west Poland)
Wesółka, Masovian Voivodeship (east-central Poland)